Alexandru Cecal (July 18, 1940 – November 1, 2021) was a chemist, professor at the Alexandru Ioan Cuza University of Iași, Romania, known especially for his contributions in the field of radiochemistry.

Education
Cecal was born in Cahul, Moldavian SSR and attended the primary school in Pianu, Alba County (1947–1951), continuing his studies (1951–1957) at the Boys' Middle School (former Mihai Viteazul Theoretical High School, now Horea, Cloșca and Crișan National College) from Alba Iulia.

Between 1958 and 1963, he attended the University of Bucharest (Physical chemistry/Radiochemistry). He fulfilled several postdoctoral appointments in universities and research centers such as Technical University of Munich (group of Hans-Joachim Born), TU Dresden, Forschungszentrum Karlsruhe, Moscow State University (group of Alexander Nesmeyanov), Laval University, etc.

Relevant publications

References

1940 births
2021 deaths
People from Cahul
Alexandru Ioan Cuza University alumni
University of Bucharest alumni
Romanian chemists
Romanian inventors
Academic staff of Alexandru Ioan Cuza University